The  is a city tram station on the Takaoka Kidō Line located in Takaoka, Toyama Prefecture, Japan.

Surrounding area
Near the JR West Himi Line Fushiki Station and the ferry port.

Railway stations in Toyama Prefecture